Mohabbat Zindagi Hai is a 1975 Pakistani Urdu colour film directed by Iqbal Akhtar and produced by Begum Riaz. It is a romance film and a musical film. It cast Mohammad Ali, Zeba, Waheed Murad, Mumtaz, Nayyar Sultana, Qavi Khan, Saqi and Lehri. Waheed Murad played a secondary role and Zeba played a lead role against Mohammad Ali.

Cast
 Zeba
 Mohammad Ali
 Waheed Murad
 Mumtaz
 Lehri
 Qavi
 Nayyar Sultana
 Saqi
 Zeenat
 Zarqa
 Khalid Saleem Mota
 Mustafa Tind
 Shahnawaz

Release
Mohabbat Zindagi Hai was released by Ayaz Films on 6 June 1975 in Pakistani cinemas. The film completed 12 weeks on main cinemas and 59 weeks on other cinemas in Karachi and, thus, became a Golden Jubilee film.

Music
The music of the film is composed by M Ashraf and the songs are written by Masroor Anwar. Playback singers are Ahmed Rushdi, Mehdi Hassan and Nahid Akhtar. One song of the film became very popular especially Dil ko jalana hum ne chorr diya....

Dil ko jalana hum ne chorr diya, chorr diya... by Ahmed Rushdi
Mashriqi rang ko chorr kar... by Ahmed Rushdi
Main shair to nahin, ghazal kehne ko jee chahata hai... by Mehdi Hassan
 Turu Turu Tara Tara, Bolay Yeh Dil Ik Tara... by Nahid Akhtar
 Dil Sanbhala Na Jaye... by Naheed Akhtar
 Teri Ankhon Ko Jab Dekha... by Mehdi Hassan

References

1975 films
Pakistani romantic musical films
1970s Urdu-language films
Urdu-language Pakistani films